Raphaël Adam (21 July 1860 – after 1940) was a 19th–20th-century French chansonnier and playwright.

A prolific chansonnier of the interwar period, his theatre plays were presented on the most significant Parisian stages of his time including the Théâtre du Gymnase, the Théâtre de Belleville, and the Théâtre des Folies-Dramatiques.

Works 
 Theatre
1890: Prête-moi ton habit, comedy in 1 act
1891: Le Borgne, drama in 5 acts
1896: Ta femme engraisse, comedy in 1 act
1897: Les Ramoneurs, drama in 5 acts and 7 tableaux
1899: L'Hôtesse, one-act play, in verse
1901: Le Clown, drama in 5 acts and 7 tableaux
1911: Les Truands, opéra comique in 3 acts and 4 tableaux
1912: Le Prince Bonheur, opéra comique in 3 acts
1914: L'Évadé, drama in 5 acts and 7 tableaux
1917: Le Budget de l'amour, comedy in 1 act, with Joseph Vassivière
1924: Je suis un loup !, scène dramatique, music by Paul Maye
1932: Babaou, musical theatre, with Louis-Jacques Boucot, music by Pierre Chagnon and Fred Pearly
undated: Une Plage d'amour, operetta in 2 acts, with Eugène Joullot

 Songs
1885: "Un Baiser!", ditty, lyrics by Georges Laure and Raphaël Adam, music by Charles d'Orvict
1888: "Larmes d'amour!", song, lyrics by Raphaël Adam, music by Gaston Maquis
1911: "Lolita l'Andalouse", song
1911: "Willie de Chicago", lyrics by Raphaël Adam and Joë, music by Paul Knox
1911: "L'Amour brisé", sung waltz, lyrics by Raphaël Adam, music by Charles Borel-Clerc
1911: "L'Amour me fait peur!", sung waltz, lyrics by Raphaël Adam, music by René Casabianca
1911: "Nita l'Argentine", song, music by Casabianca
1912: "C'est rien!", song
1912: "Non, je ne te crois plus!", sung waltz, lyrics by Raphaël Adam, music by Ulysse Rebatet
1912: "Gilda", Italian song, lyrics by Franz Gravereau and Raphaël Adam., music by Cléon Triandaphyl
1912: "La petite Branche Keurie", lyrics by Raphaël Adam, music by Maxime Guitton
1913: "Bonsoir, chéri!", song - waltz, music by Octave Lamart
1913: "Soyez bons pour les ouvriers !", monologue, lyrics by Raphael Adam, music by Octave Lamart
1913: "Tu partis!... Tu revins!...", song, music by Lamart
1914: "Joli Baby", melody, lyrics by Raphaël Adam, music by Georges Blangy and Clément Jenner
1914: "Le savez-vous ?", waltz melody, music by Blangy and Jenner
1914: "Sur la Rive fleurie!", song, music by Blangy and Jenner
1915: "L'Angelus d'Alsace", melody, lyrics by Raphaël Adam and Gaston Gross, music by Louis Billaut
1915: "C'était très chic le Tangs!", satirical song, lyrics by Raphaël Adam and Gaston Gross, music by Louis Billaut
1915: "Dormez en Paix, soldats!", poem, music by Louis Billaut
1915: "Sur les Bras des mamans", poem by Raphaël Adam, music by Louis Billaut
1915: "La Liberté au dessus de tout!", march and Allied patriotic song, lyrics by Raphaël Adam and Gaston Gross, music by Louis Billaut
1915: "La Voix de la Lorraine!", song, lyrics by Raphaël Adam and Gaston Gross, music by Léopold Danty
1915: "C'est pour la France!", patriotic song, lyrics by Raphaël Adam and Jean Meudrot, music by Louis Billaut
1915: "Le Plumet du Saint-Cyrien", lyrics by Raphaël Adam, music by René de Buxeuil
1915: "C'était très chic le tango!", satirical song, with Gross, music by Billaut
1915: "L'oiseau sans ailes", slow waltz, music by Blangy and Jenner
1916: "La Danse pour la vie ou la Danseuse masquée ou Madeleine", song
1923: "Le Régiment de l'avenir", voice and piano, lyrics by Raphaël Adam, music by Ernest Vital Louis Gillet
1924: "La Louve", voice and piano, lyrics by Raphaël Adam, music by Joseph Sieulle
1926: "Marche des petites reines", voice and piano
1936: "Le Chêne géant", voice and piano, lyrics by Raphaël Adam, music by Édouard Van Malderen
1936: "Dix sous d'jetons", voice and piano, music by Van Malderen
1937: "Chez les Papous!", sung fox-trot for orchestra with leading piano

References

Bibliography 
 Florian Bruyas, Histoire de l'opérette en France, 1855-1965, 1974, 

French chansonniers
19th-century French dramatists and playwrights
20th-century French dramatists and playwrights
1860 births
Year of death missing